Section 17 of the Constitution Act, 1867 is the provision of the Constitution of Canada which created the federal Parliament of Canada. The Parliament is composed of the Queen of Canada; the appointed upper house, the Senate of Canada; and the elected lower house, the House of Commons of Canada. Political power rests mainly with the elected House of Commons. 

The Constitution Act, 1867 is the constitutional statute which established Canada.  Originally named the British North America Act, 1867, the Act continues to be the foundational statute for the Constitution of Canada, although it has been amended many times since 1867.  It is now recognised as part of the supreme law of Canada.

Constitution Act, 1867

The Constitution Act, 1867 is part of the Constitution of Canada and thus part of the supreme law of Canada.  It was the product of extensive negotiations by the governments of the British North American provinces in the 1860s. The Act sets out the constitutional framework of Canada, including  the structure of the federal government and the powers of the federal government and the provinces.  Originally enacted in 1867 by the British Parliament under the name the British North America Act, 1867, in 1982 the Act was brought under full Canadian control through the Patriation of the Constitution, and was renamed the Constitution Act, 1867.  Since Patriation the Act can only be amended in Canada, under the amending formula set out in the Constitution Act, 1982.

Text of section 17 

Section 17 reads:

Section 17 is found in Part IV of the Constitution Act, 1867, dealing with legislative power.  It has not been amended since the Act was enacted in 1867.

Purpose and interpretation
Section 17 establishes a bicameral parliament, modelled on the British Parliament. The Queen's role is primarily ceremonial, although her assent is necessary for a bill passed by the two houses of Parliament to become law.  Her role is almost invariably performed by the Queen's representative, the Governor General of Canada, on her behalf.

The upper house, the Senate, is an appointed body.  The senators are allocated by regions, with the Maritime region, Quebec region, Ontario region, and Western region each having twenty-six senators. Newfoundland and Labrador and the three territories are not part of any region.  Newfoundland and Labrador has six senators, and each territory has one senator. Senators are appointed by the Governor General on the advice of the prime minister of Canada, and serve until age 75.

The seats in the lower house, the House of Commons, are allocated amongst the provinces, roughly based on population.  The members of the House of Commons are elected on the basis of single-member constituencies (popularly called  ridings), on a first-past-the-post basis.  Elections are generally held every four years, but can be held more frequently if there is a minority government.

The Senate and the House of Commons have almost identical legislative powers.  The only difference between the two is that appropriation and tax bills must originate in the House of Commons. However, the House of Commons is the dominant house, since it has greater democratic legitimacy than the appointed Senate.  Under the principles of responsible government, the prime minister and federal cabinet are responsible to the House of Commons,  and must maintain the confidence of the Commons.

Related provisions
The composition of the Senate is set out in sections 21 to 36 of the Act.

The composition of the House of Commons is set out in sections 37 to 52 of the Act.

Specific provisions about the passage of types of legislation, the monarch’s power to give royal assent to bills, and the possibility of reservation or disallowance of bills, are set out in sections 53 to 57 of the Act.

Section 91 of the Act sets out the major areas of legislative jurisdiction of the federal Parliament.

Paragraph 93(4) of the Act gives the federal Parliament a power to enact laws to protect rights of religious minorities (Protestant or Roman Catholic) with respect to publicly funded separate schools.

Section 94 of the Act gives the federal Parliament the power to enact uniform laws for Ontario, Nova Scotia and New Brunswick.

Section 94A of the Act gives the federal Parliament the power to enact laws relating to old age pensions and related benefits.

Section 95 of the Act gives the federal Parliament the power to enact laws relating to agriculture and immigration.

Section 101 of the Act gives the federal Parliament the power to create the Supreme Court of Canada and other federal courts.

References 

Constitution of Canada
Canadian Confederation
Federalism in Canada